Giulio Versorese (born 11 May 1868) was an Italian painter.

He was  born in Florence. He studied at the Academy of Fine Arts of Florence. He exhibited at the Promotrice of Florence . He also completed portraits, among them of Lieutenant Grimaldi, signor Rapi, and the painter Emilio Amadei, as well as many studies of the surroundings of Florence including Cascine painted outdoors, and figures in open air, including pastels and watercolors.

References

1868 births
19th-century Italian painters
Italian male painters
Painters from Florence
Year of death missing
Accademia di Belle Arti di Firenze alumni
19th-century Italian male artists